Yoruba Canadians are Canadians of Yoruba descent. The Yoruba people are an ethnic group of southwestern Nigeria and southern Benin in West Africa. They represent the second largest ethnic community of Nigerians in Canada. According to the 2016 Canadian census by Statistics Canada, 16,210 respondents spoke Yoruba at home ranking it as one of the most spoken Niger-Congo language in the country. Many are descendants of African American slaves while recent migrants come directly from West Africa.

Notable Yoruba-Canadians
 Thomas Peters
 Jarome Iginla
 Bunmi Banjo
 Foluke Akinradewo
 Fikayo Tomori
 Tesho Akindele
 Demi Orimoloye

See also

 Yoruba Americans
 Nigerian Canadians

References

External links

Ethnic groups in Canada
Canadian people of Yoruba descent
Yoruba diaspora